Savik Sevranyan (born February 20, 1974, in Yerevan) is an Armenian journalist who has served as the president of the Union of Journalists of Armenia since 2017.

References

Living people
1974 births
Armenian journalists